Bubenheim is a municipality in the Donnersbergkreis district, in Rhineland-Palatinate, Germany. Bubenheim has an area of 2.94 km² and a population of 419 (as of December 31, 2020).

References

Donnersbergkreis